Milla Sannoner (1938–2003) was an Italian film and television actress.

Selected filmography
 The Changing of the Guard (1962)
 Grand Canyon Massacre (1964)
 Three Graves for a Winchester (1966)
 A Man for Emmanuelle (1969)
 A Pocketful of Chestnuts (1970)
 Sandokan (1976, TV series)
 Madly in Love (1981)

References

Bibliography 
 Pitts, Michael R. Western Movies: A Guide to 5,105 Feature Films. McFarland, 2012.

External links 
 

1938 births
2003 deaths
Italian film actresses
Italian television actresses
People from Pesaro